In organic chemistry, an aldehyde is an organic compound containing a functional group with the structure . The functional group itself (without the "R" side chain) can be referred to as an aldehyde but can also be classified as a formyl group.  Aldehydes are common and play important roles in the technology and biological spheres.

Structure and bonding
Aldehydes feature a carbon center that is connected by a double bond to oxygen and a single bond to hydrogen and single bond to a third substituent, which is carbon or, in the case of formaldehyde, hydrogen. The central carbon is often described as being sp2-hybridized. The aldehyde group is somewhat polar.   The  bond length is about 120-122 picometers.

Physical properties and characterization
Aldehydes have properties that are diverse and that depend on the remainder of the molecule. Smaller aldehydes are more soluble in water, formaldehyde and acetaldehyde completely so. The volatile aldehydes have pungent odors.

Aldehydes can be identified by spectroscopic methods. Using IR spectroscopy, they display a strong νCO band near 1700 cm−1. In their 1H NMR spectra, the formyl hydrogen center absorbs near δH 9.5 to 10, which is a distinctive part of the spectrum. This signal shows the characteristic coupling to any protons on the α carbon with a small coupling constant typically less than 3.0 Hz.  The 13C NMR spectra of aldehydes and ketones gives a suppressed (weak) but distinctive signal at δC 190 to 205.

Applications and occurrence
 Important aldehydes and related compounds. The aldehyde group (or formyl group) is colored red.  From the left: (1) formaldehyde and (2) its trimer 1,3,5-trioxane, (3) acetaldehyde and (4) its enol vinyl alcohol, (5) glucose (pyranose form as α--glucopyranose), (6) the flavorant cinnamaldehyde,  (7) retinal, which forms with opsins photoreceptors, and (8) the vitamin pyridoxal.

Naturally occurring aldehydes
Traces of many aldehydes are found in essential oils and often contribute to their favorable odours, e.g. cinnamaldehyde, cilantro, and vanillin. Possibly because of the high reactivity of the formyl group, aldehydes are not common in several of the natural building blocks: amino acids, nucleic acids, lipids. Most sugars, however, are derivatives of aldehydes. These aldoses exist as hemiacetals, a sort of masked form of the parent aldehyde. For example, in aqueous solution only a tiny fraction of glucose exists as the aldehyde.

Synthesis
There are several methods for preparing aldehydes, but the dominant technology is hydroformylation. Illustrative is the generation of butyraldehyde by hydroformylation of propene:
H2 + CO + CH3CH=CH2 -> CH3CH2CH2CHO

Oxidative routes
Aldehydes are commonly generated by alcohol oxidation. In industry, formaldehyde is produced on a large scale by oxidation of methanol. Oxygen is the reagent of choice, being "green" and cheap. In the laboratory, more specialized oxidizing agents are used, but chromium(VI) reagents are popular. Oxidation can be achieved by heating the alcohol with an acidified solution of potassium dichromate. In this case, excess dichromate will further oxidize the aldehyde to a carboxylic acid, so either the aldehyde is distilled out as it forms (if volatile) or milder reagents such as PCC are used.
[O] + CH3(CH2)9OH -> CH3(CH2)8CHO + H2O

Oxidation of primary alcohols to form aldehydes can be achieved under milder, chromium-free conditions by employing methods or reagents such as IBX acid, Dess–Martin periodinane, Swern oxidation, TEMPO,.  

Another oxidation route significant in industry is the Wacker process, whereby ethylene is oxidized to acetaldehyde in the presence of copper and palladium catalysts (acetaldehyde is also produced on a large scale by the hydration of acetylene).

On the laboratory scale, α-hydroxy acids are used as precursors to prepare aldehydes via oxidative cleavage.

Specialty methods

Common reactions
Aldehydes participate in many reactions. From the industrial perspective, important reactions are (a) condensations, e.g., to prepare plasticizers and polyols, and (b) reduction to produce alcohols, especially "oxo-alcohols". From the biological perspective, the key reactions involve addition of nucleophiles to the formyl carbon in the formation of imines (oxidative deamination) and hemiacetals (structures of aldose sugars).

Acid-base reactions
Because of resonance stabilization of the conjugate base, an α-hydrogen in an aldehyde is weakly acidic, with a pKa near 17. This acidification is attributed to (i) the electron-withdrawing quality of the formyl center and (ii) the fact that the conjugate base, an enolate anion, delocalizes its negative charge.  The formyl proton itself does not readily undergo deprotonation.

Enolization
Aldehydes (except those without an alpha carbon, or without protons on the alpha carbon, such as formaldehyde and benzaldehyde) can exist in either the keto or the enol tautomer. Keto–enol tautomerism is catalyzed by either acid or base. Usually the enol is the minority tautomer, but it is more reactive. The enolization typically reverses several times per second.

Reduction

The formyl group can be readily reduced to a primary alcohol. Typically this conversion is accomplished by catalytic hydrogenation either directly or by transfer hydrogenation. Stoichiometric reductions are also popular, as can be effected with sodium borohydride.

Oxidation
The formyl group readily oxidizes to the corresponding carboxyl group. The preferred oxidant in industry is oxygen or air. In the laboratory, popular oxidizing agents include potassium permanganate, nitric acid, chromium(VI) oxide, and chromic acid. The combination of manganese dioxide, cyanide, acetic acid and methanol will convert the aldehyde to a methyl ester.

Another oxidation reaction is the basis of the silver-mirror test. In this test, an aldehyde is treated with Tollens' reagent, which is prepared by adding a drop of sodium hydroxide solution into silver nitrate solution to give a precipitate of silver(I) oxide, and then adding just enough dilute ammonia solution to redissolve the precipitate in aqueous ammonia to produce  complex. This reagent converts aldehydes to carboxylic acids without attacking carbon–carbon double bonds. The name silver-mirror test arises because this reaction produces a precipitate of silver, whose presence can be used to test for the presence of an aldehyde.

A further oxidation reaction involves Fehling's reagent as a test. The  complex ions are reduced to a red-brick-coloured  precipitate.

If the aldehyde cannot form an enolate (e.g., benzaldehyde), addition of strong base induces the Cannizzaro reaction. This reaction results in disproportionation, producing a mixture of alcohol and carboxylic acid.

Nucleophilic addition reactions
Nucleophiles add readily to the carbonyl group. In the product, the carbonyl carbon becomes sp3-hybridized, being bonded to the nucleophile, and the oxygen center becomes protonated:
 

In many cases, a water molecule is removed after the addition takes place; in this case, the reaction is classed as an addition–elimination or addition–condensation reaction. There are many variations of nucleophilic addition reactions.

Oxygen nucleophiles
In the acetalisation reaction, under acidic or basic conditions, an alcohol adds to the carbonyl group and a proton is transferred to form a hemiacetal. Under acidic conditions, the hemiacetal and the alcohol can further react to form an acetal and water. Simple hemiacetals are usually unstable, although cyclic ones such as glucose can be stable. Acetals are stable, but revert to the aldehyde in the presence of acid. Aldehydes can react with water to form hydrates, . These diols are stable when strong electron withdrawing groups are present, as in chloral hydrate. The mechanism of formation is identical to hemiacetal formation.

Nitrogen nucleophiles
In alkylimino-de-oxo-bisubstitution, a primary or secondary amine adds to the carbonyl group and a proton is transferred from the nitrogen to the oxygen atom to create a carbinolamine. In the case of a primary amine, a water molecule can be eliminated from the carbinolamine intermediate to yield an imine or its trimer, a hexahydrotriazine This reaction is catalyzed by acid. Hydroxylamine can also add to the carbonyl group. After the elimination of water, this results in an oxime. An ammonia derivative of the form  such as hydrazine or 2,4-dinitrophenylhydrazine can also be the nucleophile and after the elimination of water, resulting in the formation of a hydrazone, which are usually orange crystalline solids. This reaction forms the basis of a test for aldehydes and ketones.

Carbon nucleophiles
The cyano group in HCN can add to the carbonyl group to form cyanohydrins, . In this reaction the  ion is the nucleophile that attacks the partially positive carbon atom of the carbonyl group. The mechanism involves a pair of electrons from the carbonyl-group double bond transferring to the oxygen atom, leaving it single-bonded to carbon and giving the oxygen atom a negative charge.

Organometallic compounds, such as organolithium reagents, Grignard reagents, or acetylides, undergo nucleophilic addition reactions, yielding a substituted alcohol group. Related reactions include organostannane additions, Barbier reactions, and the Nozaki–Hiyama–Kishi reaction.

In the aldol reaction, the metal enolates of ketones, esters, amides, and carboxylic acids add to aldehydes to form β-hydroxycarbonyl compounds (aldols). Acid or base-catalyzed dehydration then leads to α,β-unsaturated carbonyl compounds. The combination of these two steps is known as the aldol condensation.

The Prins reaction occurs when a nucleophilic alkene or alkyne reacts with an aldehyde as electrophile. The product of the Prins reaction varies with reaction conditions and substrates employed.

Bisulfite reaction
Aldehydes characteristically form "addition compounds" with bisulfites:
 RCHO + HSO3- -> RCH(OH)SO3-
This reaction is used as a test for aldehydes and is useful for separation or purification of aldehydes.

More complex reactions

Dialdehydes 

A dialdehyde is an organic chemical compound with two aldehyde groups. The nomenclature of dialdehydes have the ending -dial or sometimes -dialdehyde. Short aliphatic dialdehydes are sometimes named after the diacid from which they can be derived. An example is butanedial, which is also called succinaldehyde (from succinic acid).

Biochemistry
Some aldehydes are substrates for aldehyde dehydrogenase enzymes which metabolize aldehydes in the body. There are toxicities associated with some aldehydes that are related to neurodegenerative disease, heart disease, and some types of cancer.

Examples of aldehydes
 Formaldehyde (methanal)
 Acetaldehyde (ethanal)
 Propionaldehyde (propanal)
 Butyraldehyde (butanal)
 Isovaleraldehyde 
 Benzaldehyde (phenylmethanal)
 Cinnamaldehyde
 Vanillin
 Tolualdehyde
 Furfural
 Retinaldehyde
Glycolaldehyde

Examples of dialdehydes
 Glyoxal
 Malondialdehyde
 Succindialdehyde
 Glutaraldehyde
 Phthalaldehyde

Uses
It is mainly used in the production of resins when combined with urea, melamine, and phenol (e.g., Bakelite). It is a precursor to methylene diphenyl diisocyanate ("MDI"), a precursor to polyurethanes. It is the principal precursor to 2-ethylhexanol, which is used as a plasticizer. Acetaldehyde once was a dominating product, but production levels have declined to less than  because it mainly served as a precursor to acetic acid, which is now prepared by carbonylation of methanol. Many other aldehydes find commercial applications, often as precursors to alcohols, the so-called oxo alcohols, which are used in detergents. Some aldehydes are produced only on a small scale (less than 1000 tons per year) and are used as ingredients in flavours and perfumes such as Chanel No. 5. These include cinnamaldehyde and its derivatives, citral, and lilial.

Nomenclature

IUPAC names for aldehydes
The common names for aldehydes do not strictly follow official guidelines, such as those recommended by IUPAC, but these rules are useful. IUPAC prescribes the following nomenclature for aldehydes:
 Acyclic aliphatic aldehydes are named as derivatives of the longest carbon chain containing the aldehyde group.
 In other cases, such as when a  group is attached to a ring, the suffix -carbaldehyde may be used. Thus,  is known as cyclohexanecarbaldehyde. If the presence of another functional group demands the use of a suffix, the aldehyde group is named with the prefix formyl-. This prefix is preferred to methanoyl-.  
 If the compound is a natural product or a carboxylic acid, the prefix oxo- may be used to indicate which carbon atom is part of the aldehyde group; for example,  is named 3-oxoethanoic acid.
 If replacing the aldehyde group with a carboxyl group would yield a carboxylic acid with a trivial name, the aldehyde may be named by replacing the suffix -ic acid or -oic acid in this trivial name by -aldehyde.

Etymology
The word aldehyde was coined by Justus von Liebig as a contraction of the Latin  (dehydrogenated alcohol). In the past, aldehydes were sometimes named after the corresponding alcohols, for example, vinous aldehyde for acetaldehyde. (Vinous is from Latin  "wine", the traditional source of ethanol, cognate with vinyl.)

The term formyl group is derived from the Latin word  "ant". This word can be recognized in the simplest aldehyde, formaldehyde, and in the simplest carboxylic acid, formic acid.

See also 
 Enol
 Pseudoacid

References

External links

 
Functional groups
1830s neologisms